Médine Zaouiche (born 24 February 1983 in Le Havre), better known by his stage name Médine, is a French rapper of Algerian descent. He has been a part of the hip hop collective La Boussole since 1996.  Médine is a practicing Muslim, and many of his lyrics deal with the hardships of migrants, oppressed individuals, and  Muslims in the Western world. One article he wrote for Time magazine after the 2005 riots was entitled "How Much More French Can I Be".

Médine is French for Medina.

Biography

Origins and youth 
His father, born in Kabylie, arrived in France when he was four years old. He worked as an employee in a packaging company and is a semi-professional boxer then trainer. His mother was born in France. A stay-at-home mother, she then became a childminder. Médine grew up in Le Havre, in Caucriauville.

Médine France and tour 
In May 2022, Médine released his album Médine France on 13 May and announced a tour of France. The tour will begin at festivals on 4 June and will notably pass through the Casino of Paris on 19 October 2022.

Discography

Projects

Singles

See also
Kery James

References

External links
French Muslim Band Speaks Against Racism, Terror
How much more French can I be?  TIME Magazine editorial by Médinef

1983 births
French rappers
French Muslims
French people of Algerian descent
Living people
Musicians from Le Havre
Rappers from Seine-Maritime